Tony Harrison (born 1937) is an English poet.

Tony Harrison may also refer to:
 Tony Harrison (boxer), professional boxer
 Tony Harrison (lobbyist), Tasmanian lobbyist
 Tony Harrison, a character in the TV series The Mighty Boosh

See also
 Anthony Harrison
 Tony Harris (disambiguation)
 Tory Harrison